Madagascar for the Malagasy, political party in Madagascar, usually known as Madagasikara otronin'ny Malagasy (Monima), and as MONIMA (the abbreviation for the  French name of the organization, Mouvement Nationaliste et Indépendant de Madagascar).

The National President of the party is Monja Roindefo and its Secretary general is Gabriel Rabearimanana.

The party is one of the oldest political parties, founded by Monja Jaona, mayor of the city of Toliara, in the 1950s. It played a significant role in the unrest that led to president Tsiranana's downfall in 1972.

In the 2007 elections, the party has formed an alliance with Tambatra and Manaovasoa, known as TMM, in opposition to the ruling TIM party. Since the 23 September 2007 National Assembly elections it is no longer represented in parliament

References

Political parties in Madagascar
Malagasy nationalism
1950s establishments in Madagascar